Stupino is a general aviation airport located 5 km east of Stupino, Moscow Oblast, Russia.

It was a military transport base until the late-1990s, home to 436th Independent Transport Aviation Regiment (436 OTAP) under the command of Soviet Anti-Air Defense (PVO) flying Mil Mi-8 helicopters between 1970 and 1998 and between 1952 and 1959 the base hosted the 162nd Fighter Aviation Regiment which used both the Mikoyan-Gurevich MiG-15 (ASCC: Fagot) and the Mikoyan-Gurevich MiG-17 (ASCC: Fresco).

References

External links
RussianAirFields.com

Soviet Air Force bases
Soviet Military Transport Aviation
Soviet Air Defence Force bases
Russian Air Force bases